Santa Monica is a city in western Los Angeles County, California, U.S.

Santa Monica may also refer to:

Places
 Santa Mônica, Paraná, Brazil
 Santa Mônica in Lages, Brazil
 Santa Monica, Tlalnepantla de Baz, Mexico
 Santa Monica, Surigao del Norte, Philippines

US
 Santa Monica, Florida, U.S.
 Santa Monica Airport, Santa Monica, California, U.S.
 Santa Monica Boulevard, a major avenue in Los Angeles County, U.S.

Songs
"Santa Monica" (Everclear song), by Everclear, 1995
"Santa Monica" (Savage Garden song), 1998
"Santa Monica" (Theory of a Deadman song), 2005
"Santa Monica", a song by Bedouin Soundclash from their album Root Fire (2001)

Other uses
Santa Monica Parish Church (disambiguation), name of several churches
Santa Monica Studio, an American video game developer, known for God of War
University of Santa Monica, Santa Monica, California, U.S.

See also

Saint Monica (film), a 2002 Canadian film 
Saint Monica (c. 331/2 − 387), also known as Monica of Hippo, an early Christian saint
Sainte-Monique, Quebec (disambiguation), several places in Canada
San Monique (fictional location) from James Bond

Monica (disambiguation)
Monika (disambiguation)
Monique (disambiguation)